Alvear is a Spanish surname. Notable people with the surname include:

Cecilia Alvear, Ecuadorian-born American television journalist
Soledad Alvear (born 1950), Chilean lawyer and politician
Yuri Alvear (born 1986), Colombian judoka

See also
de Alvear

Spanish-language surnames